Bernard Goutta (born 28 September 1972 in Perpignan), is a French former professional rugby league and rugby union footballer and current rugby union coach. He is now co-head coach of his former union club, USA Perpignan, following the sacking of predecessor Jacques Brunel in November 2011.

Goutta began playing Rugby League at with Saint Estève XIII, then with the Pia Donkeys. He switched code, playing Rugby Union for Perpignan. He earned his only cap for the France national team on 10 July 2004 against the Canada at Toronto. After ending his playing career, he joined Brunel's staff as forwards coach.

Honours 
 French rugby champion, 2009 with USA Perpignan (assistant coach)
 French rugby champion finalist, 1998, 2004 (player), 2010 (assistant coach)
 Heineken Cup runner up: 2003 (player)

External links 
 Bernard Goutta International Statistics

Sportspeople from Perpignan
French rugby league players
French rugby union players
France international rugby union players
USA Perpignan coaches
USA Perpignan players
1972 births
Living people
AS Saint Estève players
Baroudeurs de Pia XIII players